Chaetaglaea cerata, the waxed sallow, is a species of moth in the family Noctuidae described by John G. Franclemont in 1943. It is found in North America, where it has been recorded from Connecticut, Indiana, Maine, Michigan, Ohio, Ontario, Pennsylvania and Wisconsin.

The wingspan is about 35 mm. The forewings are pale greyish tan with whitish veins. It is listed as a species of special concern in Connecticut.
The larvae feed on  blueberry, scrub oak and species in the genus Prunus.

References

Xylenini
Moths described in 1943